Guangdong Hongyuan Southern Tigers or Guangdong Southern Tigers, also known as Guangdong Dongguan Bank for sponsorship reasons, are a Chinese professional basketball team owned by the Guangdong Winnerway (Hongyuan) Group. The team is one of the best-performing teams in the Chinese Basketball Association (CBA). The Tigers have won eleven CBA titles, more than any other team in the league. They are also the only team to have qualified for the CBA playoffs in every season since the league launched in 1995. The team plays its home games in Dongguan, Guangdong. Occasionally, for marketing purposes, the team plays some of its home games in Zhongshan, Zhuhai, and other cities in the Pearl River Delta.

Their arch-rivals in the CBA have traditionally been the Beijing Ducks.

History
Established in 1993, the Tigers are the main team (Team 1) of the Guangdong Southern Tigers Basketball Club which is the first privately (non-government) owned professional basketball club in China. Besides Team 1, the club has three reserve teams (youth teams): Team 2 (Guangzhou based), Team 3A (Guangzhou based), and Team 3B (Dongguan based). These reserve teams are jointly administrated by the club and by the Guangdong Provincial Sports Bureau.

The Southern Tigers have been CBA members since its inception and are the most successful team in the league. In the 1995–96 season, the Tigers qualified for the finals but lost to Bayi Rockets. After a seven-year wait, they made it to the finals again in 2002–03, and in 2003–04, the team claimed its first ever CBA title. Between 2002–03 and 2012–13, the team played in the finals eleven times in a row, winning eight CBA championships and losing three times.

The team has also participated in the National Games of China, on behalf of the Guangdong Province. In 2009, they won the first National Games gold medal in basketball for their province. They defended the title in 2013.

Players

Current roster

Retired numbers

Season-by-season record

Honours
 Chinese Basketball Association
Playoffs Champions (11): 2003–04, 2004–05, 2005–06, 2007–08, 2008–09, 2009–10, 2010–11, 2012–13, 2018–19, 2019–20, 2020–21
Playoffs Runners-up (5): 1995–96, 2002–03, 2006–07, 2011–12, 2016–17
Regular Season Champions (14): 2002–03, 2003–04, 2005–06 (South Division), 2006–07, 2007–08, 2008–09, 2009–10, 2011–12, 2012–13, 2013–14, 2014–15, 2018–19, 2019–20, 2020–21
Regular Season Runners-up (5): 1995–96, 1999–2000, 2004–05 (South Division), 2010–11, 2016–17

 FIBA Asia Champions Cup
Third Place: 1996

 National Club Championship
Winners: 1998

 Asian Club Championship
Winners: 2012

 National Men's Basketball Group B League
Winners: 1995

References

External links 
 Team profile 

 
Chinese Basketball Association teams
Sports teams in Guangdong
Basketball teams established in 1993
1993 establishments in China
Sport in Dongguan